Hüber is a surname. Notable people with the surname include:

 Fortunatus Hueber (1639–1706), West German Franciscan historian and theologian
 Joseph Hueber (1715 or 1717–1787), Austrian baroque master builder
 Sven Hüber (born 1964), East German former political officer

German-language surnames

See also 
 Huber (German-language surname)
 Hueber (French-language surname)
 Pou (surname)
 Pou (disambiguation)